Gulu is a City in the Northern Region of Uganda. The regional headquarters are located in the city of Gulu, which is also the administrative capital of Northern Uganda The city consist of two main divisions... Gulu west and Gulu east.

Location
Gulu District is bordered by Lamwo District to the north, Pader District and Omoro District to the east, Oyam District to the south, Nwoya District to the southwest, and Amuru District to the west. The coordinates of the district are, near the city of Gulu are:02°49'50.0"N, 32°19'13.0"E (Latitude:2.830556; Longitude:32.320278).

Overview
As of November 2019, the district was one of the eight districts that constituted the Acholi sub-region, the historical homeland of the Acholi ethnic group. The district is composed of Aswa County and the Gulu Municipal Council. The economic activity of 90 per cent of the population in the district is subsistence agriculture.

The district has been the location of much of the fighting between the Ugandan army and the Lord's Resistance Army. Over 90 percent of the population has returned to their villages after more than two decades of living in what were known as "Internally Displaced People Camps".

Population
The national census conducted in 2002 put the population at 193,337. In the 2014 national census and household survey, the population of Gulu District was enumerated at 275,613.

Notable people
The district is the birthplace of the poet and writer Okot p'Bitek; former UNLA top military officer Brigadier George William Nyero.

References

External links

 Website of Gulu District

 
Acholi sub-region
Districts of Uganda
Northern Region, Uganda